Simone Pratt is a professional Bahamian tennis player. Pratt has been ranked as high as world number 953 in singles by the Women's Tennis Association (WTA). She has also participated in Fed Cup competition, representing The Bahamas, and has an 11-11 win/loss record as of 2013.

On the Junior Circuit, Pratt's world highest world ranking, as of September 2013, was 173rd, which she achieved in 2012. However, she then suffered a drastic drop in the rankings, falling to 649th in March 2013. After that, she made a comeback and the summer of 2013 has seen her win three consecutive singles tournaments which have lifted her ranking to 196th.

Pratt is currently a sophomore at ASA College in Miami. She is of African descent.

ITF Junior Finals

Singles Finals (5–5)

Doubles finals (3–4)

References 

 
 

1996 births
Living people
Bahamian female tennis players
People from Grand Bahama
Competitors at the 2018 Central American and Caribbean Games